Oleksiy Milyutin (also transliterated Oleksii Miliutin, ; born 10 June 1995 in Kyiv) is a Ukrainian footballer who plays as a left back.

Career
Milyutin made his professional Fortuna Liga debut for Tatran Prešov on 4 August 2017 against Nitra, when he completed the entire 90 minutes of the 0:4 home defeat.

References

External links

Oleksii Miliutin at Futbalnet 

1995 births
Living people
Footballers from Kyiv
Ukrainian footballers
Ukrainian expatriate footballers
Ukraine youth international footballers
Association football defenders
MFK Slovan Sabinov players
ŠK Odeva Lipany players
1. FC Tatran Prešov players
Slovak Super Liga players
2. Liga (Slovakia) players
3. Liga (Slovakia) players
4. Liga (Slovakia) players
5. Liga players
Expatriate footballers in Slovakia
Ukrainian expatriate sportspeople in Slovakia